Zoë Eeles (born 1975) is a Scottish actress.

Eeles was born in Dumfries, Scotland and moved to Glasgow at the age of five. Her father Bert was a film editor and her mother Donalda was an actress. She received a Higher National Certificate in theatre arts and a degree in drama from Queen Margaret College in Edinburgh.

Eeles moved to London to pursue an acting career, and gained a few bit parts in film and theatre, including a small role as a nurse in the Charlie Sheen film Obit. Her breakthrough came when she was cast in a leading role in the BBC sitcom All Along the Watchtower. In 2000, Eeles and Justin Pierre played two supporting characters (DC Sam Phillips and DS Dave Summers) to Christopher Ellison's DCI Frank Burnside in Burnside, a spin-off from police drama The Bill. Other major television roles followed, including the roles of Karen in Lucy Sullivan Is Getting Married, Tina in Auf Wiedersehen, Pet, and Annie Craig in Rockface.

References

External links

1975 births
Living people
Scottish television actresses
Alumni of Queen Margaret University
Actresses from Glasgow